Kundalini yoga derives from kundalini, defined in tantra as energy that lies within the body, frequently at the navel or the base of the spine. In normative tantric systems, kundalini is considered to be dormant until it is activated (as by the practice of yoga) and channeled upward through the central channel in a process of spiritual perfection. Other schools, such as Kashmir Shaivism, teach that there are multiple kundalini energies in different parts of the body which are active and do not require awakening. Kundalini is believed by adherents to be power associated with the divine feminine, Shakti. Kundalini yoga as a school of yoga is influenced by Shaktism and Tantra schools of Hinduism. It derives its name through a focus on awakening kundalini energy through regular practice of mantra, tantra, yantra, yoga, laya, haṭha, meditation, or even spontaneously (sahaja).

History

Name

The Sanskrit adjective  means "circular, annular". It occurs as a noun for "a snake" (in the sense "coiled", as in "forming ringlets") in the 12th-century Rajatarangini chronicle (I.2). , a noun which means "bowl, water-pot", is found as the name of a Naga in Mahabharata 1.4828.
The Sanskrit feminine noun kuṇḍalī means "ring, bracelet, coil (of a rope)", and is the name of a "serpent-like" Shakti in Tantrism as early as the 11th century, in the Śaradatilaka.

What has become known as "Kundalini yoga" in the 20th century, after a technical term particular to this tradition, is actually a synthesis of Bhakti Yoga (devotion and chanting), Raja Yoga (meditation) and Shakti Yoga (the expression of power and energy)." However, it may include haṭha yoga techniques (such as bandha, pranayama, and asana), Patañjali's kriya yoga (consisting of self-discipline, self-study, devotion to God, dhyāna, and samādhi), tantric visualization and meditation techniques of laya yoga (known as samsketas).

Laya may mean either the techniques of yoga or (like Rāja yoga) its effect of "absorption" of the individual into the cosmic. Laya yoga, from the Sanskrit term laya (meaning "dissolution", "extinction", or "absorption"), is almost always described in the context of other Yogas such as in the Yoga-Tattva-Upanishad, the Varaha Upanishad, the Goraksha Paddhati, the Amaraugha Prabodha, and the Dattatreya Yoga Shastra. The exact distinctions between traditional yoga schools are often hazy due to a long history of syncretism, hence many of the oldest sources on Kundalini come through manuals of the tantric and haṭha traditions, including the Hatha Yoga Pradipika and the Shiva Samhita. The Shiva Samhita describes the qualified yogi as practicing 'the four yogas' to achieve kundalini awakening, while lesser students may resort solely to one technique or another: "Mantra Yoga and Hatha Yoga. Laya Yoga is the third. The fourth is Raja Yoga. It is free from duality."

Hatha yoga

The Yoga-Kundalini Upanishad is a syncretistic yoga text related to the schools of Hatha and Mantra yoga.

Other Sanskrit texts treat kundalini as a technical term in tantric yoga, such as the Ṣaṭ-cakra-nirūpana and the Pādukā-pañcaka. These were translated in 1919 by John Woodroffe as The Serpent Power: The Secrets of Tantric and Shaktic Yoga. He identifies the process of involution and its techniques in these texts as a particular form of Tantrik Laya Yoga.

The Yoga-Kundalini Upanishad consists of three short chapters; it begins by stating that Chitta (consciousness) is controlled by Prana, and it is controlled by moderate food, postures and Shakti-Chala (I.1-2). Verses I.3-6 explain the concepts of moderate food and concept, and verse I.7 introduces Kundalini as the name of the Shakti under discussion:
I.7. The Sakti (mentioned above) is only Kundalini. A wise man should take it up from its place (Viz., the navel, upwards) to the middle of the eyebrows. This is called Sakti-Chala. 
I.8. In practising it, two things are necessary, Sarasvati-Chalana and the restraint of Prana (breath). Then through practice, Kundalini (which is spiral) becomes straightened.

Modern forms

Sivananda Saraswati 

Sivananda introduced many readers to Kundalini yoga with his book on the subject in 1935. This book has in-depth details about Kundalini yoga, and combines laya teachings from older sources, including the Hathapradipika.

Yogi Bhajan 

In 1968, Harbhajan Singh Khalsa, also known as Yogi Bhajan, introduced his own brand of kundalini yoga into the United States, "Kundalini Yoga as taught by Yogi Bhajan". Yogi Bhajan founded the "Healthy, Happy, Holy Organization" (3HO) as a teaching organization. Former Kundalini teacher and scholar Philip Deslippe claims that Yogi Bhajan took yogic postures and techniques, attached them to Tantric theories and Sikh mantras, synthesizing a new form of 'Kundalini' yoga. "When placed alongside the teachings of Swami Dhirendra Brahmachari and Maharaj Virsa Singh, it becomes strikingly apparent that at least in its earliest years, Yogi Bhajan's Kundalini yoga was not a distinct practice, but essentially a combination of yogic mechanics learned from the former and the Sikh-derived mantras (Ik Ongkaar, Sat Naam, Sri Waheguru) and chanting from the latter", Deslippe writes.

Principles

Kundalini is the term for "a spiritual energy or life force located at the base of the spine", conceptualized as a coiled-up serpent. The practice of Kundalini yoga is supposed to arouse the sleeping Kundalini Shakti from its coiled base through the 6 chakras, and penetrate the 7th chakra, or crown. 
This energy is said to travel along the ida (left), pingala (right) and central, or sushumna nadi - the main channels of pranic energy in the body. 

Kundalini energy is technically explained as being sparked during yogic breathing when prana and apana blends at the 3rd chakra (solar plexus) at which point it initially drops down to the 1st and 2nd chakras before traveling up to the spine to the higher centers of the brain to activate the golden cord - the connection between the pituitary and pineal glands - and penetrate the 7 chakras.
	 	
Borrowing and integrating many different approaches, Kundalini Yoga can be understood as a tri-fold approach of Bhakti yoga for devotion, Shakti yoga for power, and Raja yoga for mental power and control. Its purpose through the daily practice of kriyas and meditation in sadhana are described as a practical technology of human consciousness for humans to achieve their total creative potential. With the practice of Kundalini Yoga one is thought able to liberate oneself from one's Karma and to realize one's Dharma (Life Purpose). It is recommended to become free of desire or adopt vairagya before trying to arouse Kundalini. Additionally, having a guru is beneficial in Kundalini Yoga, because a guru can suggest the best method to awaken the Kundalini.

Practice 

The practice of kriyas and meditations in Kundalini Yoga are designed to raise complete body awareness to prepare the body, nervous system, and mind to handle the energy of Kundalini rising. The majority of the physical postures focus on navel activity, activity of the spine, and selective pressurization of body points and meridians. Breath work and the application of bandhas (3 yogic locks) aid to release, direct, and control the flow of Kundalini energy from the lower centers to the higher energetic centers.

Along with the many kriyas, meditations and practices of Kundalini Yoga, a simple breathing technique of alternate nostril breathing (left nostril, right nostril), are taught as a method to cleanse the nadis, or subtle channels and pathways, to help awaken Kundalini energy.

Sovatsky (1998) adapts a developmental and evolutionary perspective in his interpretation of Kundalini Yoga. That is, he interprets Kundalini Yoga as a catalyst for psycho-spiritual growth and bodily maturation. According to this interpretation of yoga, the body bows itself into greater maturation [...], none of which should be considered mere stretching exercises.

See also
 John Woodroffe (Arthur Avalon) wrote The Serpent Power – The Secrets of Tantric and Shaktic Yoga in 1919
 Kriya Yoga
 Sahaja Yoga
 Guru Jagat

References

Further reading

 
 Cromie, William J. (2002) Research: Meditation Changes Temperatures: Mind Controls Body in Extreme Experiments. Harvard University Gazette, 18 April 2002.
 Eastman, David T.  "Kundalini Demystified", Yoga Journal, September 1985, pp. 7–43, California Yoga Teachers Association.
 Laue, Thorsten: Tantra im Westen. Eine religionswissenschaftliche Studie über „Weißes Tantra Yoga“, „Kundalini Yoga“ und „Sikh Dharma“ in Yogi Bhajans „Healthy, Happy, Holy Organization“ (3HO) unter besonderer Berücksichtigung der „3H Organisation Deutschland e. V.“, Münster: LIT, 2012, zugl.: Tübingen, Univ., Diss., 2011,  [in German] 
 Laue, Thorsten: Kundalini Yoga, Yogi Tee und das Wassermannzeitalter. Bibliografische Einblicke in die Healthy, Happy, Holy Organization (3HO) des Yogi Bhajan. Tübingen: 2008. Online at  [in German].
 Laue, Thorsten: Kundalini Yoga, Yogi Tee und das Wassermannzeitalter. Religionswissenschaftliche Einblicke in die Healthy, Happy, Holy Organization (3HO) des Yogi Bhajan, Münster: LIT, 2007,  [in German].
 
 
 Swami Sivananda, Kundalini Yoga (1935).
 Sivananda Radha Saraswati, Kundalini Yoga for the West (1979; 2nd ed. 1996)
 The Aquarian Teacher, KRI International Teacher Training in Kundalini Yoga as taught by Yogi Bhajan, Kundalini Research Institute, 4th Edition, 2007.

External links 

 Kundalini Awakening by uncoilingsnake.com
Kundalini Yoga by Swami Shivananda
 ReligionFacts.com - Kundalini Yoga
 Kundalini Yogas FAQ
 100 rules of flow
 Lies And Damn Lies About Kundalini Yoga
Abuse in Kundalini Yoga as taught by Yogi Bhajan

 
 

Meditation
Yoga styles
Shaktism
Tantra